The Tashkent State University of Oriental Studies is a state institution of higher education in Tashkent, the capital of Uzbekistan. Founded in November 1918, the school is the only Oriental-studies institute in Central Asia and Asia's oldest Oriental institute of higher education. It is one of the largest schools of its kind in Asia and the former Soviet Union.

History 
The Turkestan Institute of Oriental Studies was founded in Tashkent in November 1918. Central Asia's first (and only) Oriental higher-educational institute, the school began preparing qualified specialists in a number of branches of Oriental studies for Turkestan and neighboring countries. Subjects included ethnography, geography, study of local lore, the history and economy of Turkestan and neighboring Oriental countries, Islamic history and law, and eastern languages and literature. Two hundred thirty-four students were accepted in 1918. They were taught Arabic, Persian, Chinese, Pushtu, Urdu, Turkish; local languages (Uzbek, Tadzhik, Kirghiz, Turkmen, Tatar), and European languages (English, German and French). Other subjects were the geography of Afghanistan, India, Iran, East and West Turkestan and Bukhara; Uzbek, Kirghiz, Persian, Tadzhik, Kazakh, Afghan and Karakalpak ethnography, and Central Asian, Iranian, Afghan, Indian and ancient history.

Third-year students were taught specialized subjects, including Turkestan languages, Iranian and Arab philology, and Islamic studies. The institute prepared language and history teachers for local schools. It had 5,300 books and over 200 manuscripts by 1922. The first dean of the Oriental faculty was A. Y. Shmidt.

It was attached to the National University of Uzbekistan in accordance with Resolution No. 186 of the Cabinet Ministers of the Republic of Uzbekistan in July 1991, and was named on the basis of a 26 July 1991 resolution by the Ministry of Higher and Secondary Special Education.

Faculties and chairs 
The institute has five faculties.

Oriental philology 

The faculty was founded for Oriental philology and history by rector orders K/05-36 (24 August 2000) and 01-142 (30 June 2011). It was renamed as the faculty of Oriental philology by rector order 01-243 on 20 September 2014.

Among Oriental-philology graduates are academicians  A. Rustamov and U. Karimov, government-prize winners I. Abdullayev, S. G’aniyeva, A. Hayitmetov and P. Qodirov, international-prize winners Q. Mahmudov, Sh. Shomuhamedov and E. Rustamov, and ambassadors S. Mirqosimov, F. Teshaboyev, A. Shayhov, S. Inog’omov and A. Usmonov.

Chairs:
Arab philology
Iranian and Afghan philology
Turkic languages
Japanese philology
South Asian languages
Eastern literature
Classical philology
Translation studies

Chinese studies 
The faculty of Chinese studies was founded by presidential order 2228 PQ on (3 September 2014) and order number 01-243 (20 September 2014).

Chairs:
Chinese language and literature
Chinese policy, history and economy
English
Pedagogy and psychology

Korean studies 
The Korean-studies faculty was founded in 2018 to train qualified specialists.

Chairs:
Korean philology
Economy and policy of South Korea
History and culture of South Korea

History and philosophy 
The faculty of history and philosophy has five departments (chairs). It had nine professors, 12 doctors of sciences, 16 science candidates and 27 senior lecturers and teachers during the 2018-2019 academic year.

Chairs:
Eastern history and contemporary issues
Central Asian history and source studies
Oriental philosophy and culture
Social sciences
Western European languages

Foreign economics and policy 
The faculty, founded in 2008, has undergone several name changes. It was created to train Oriental economists and politicians to investigate and analyze problems, social and economic development, security, and military-technical development of the Asia-Pacific region, the Middle East, and the Commonwealth of Independent States.

Chairs:
World policy and international relations
Foreign economies
International economic relations
Economic theory
Mathematics and information technology

See also 

 Imam Maturidi International Scientific Research Center

Notes 

Education in Tashkent
Oriental studies
Tashkent State University of Oriental Studies